Henry Schwarcz is a Canadian geochemist, having been a University Distinguished Professor at McMaster University. Using methods like stable isotope analysis and x-ray scattering, his research spans from paleoclimatology to paleoanthropology, including work on stalagmites from Vancouver Island and skeletal remains from the Roman settlement of Leptiminus.

References

Year of birth missing (living people)
Living people
Academic staff of McMaster University
Canadian geographers